McQueen is an unincorporated settlement in Harmon County, Oklahoma, United States.

References

Unincorporated communities in Harmon County, Oklahoma
Unincorporated communities in Oklahoma